Transmembrane protein 268 is a protein that in humans is encoded by TMEM268 gene. The protein is a transmembrane protein of 342 amino acids long with eight alternative splice variants. The protein has been identified in organisms from the common fruit fly to primates. To date, there has been no protein expression found in organisms simpler than insects.

Gene

Location 

TMEM268 maps on chromosome 9 at 9q32. The gene neighborhood for TMEM268 is shown below. The area enclosed by the red circle is TMEM268's coding region, which is surrounded by neighbors DFNB31 and ATP6V1G1.

mRNA 
Eight different alternative splice variants for TMEM268 have been found.
The exon Sequence for the combinations shown indicate combined regions. Amino acid length differs due to variants in nucleotide additions or deletions within exon regions, conferring different splice variants with similar sequence combinations.

Protein

General Characteristics 

TMEM268 has seven variants.  NP_694590.2 is the variant that is the most studied. An ExPasy result indicates TMEM268 has an isoelectric point at 5.19 and a molecular weight around 37.6 kdal. TMEM268 is a member of a domain of unknown function, DUF4481. The region is located within 37 and 328 in the amino acid sequence. BLAST results indicate there are no paralogs within humans, zebra fish, and fruit flies.

Transmembrane Characteristics 

Two predicted transmembrane regions are on the polypeptide, located at amino acids 104-125 and 130-152 respectively. The SAPS tool on the San Diego Super Computing Biology Workbench garnered protein structural characteristics.

An hypothesis for transmembrane direction is the N terminus and C terminus to remain within the cell, and the loop to stick out of the membrane into the cytosol, presented in the adjacent image. 
Evidence for the transmembrane direction stems from phosphorylation site predictions. Net Phos 2.0 results for TMEM268 indicate regions of phosphorylation that are present in areas around the transmembrane region. This indicates the N terminus and C terminus are going to be facing into the cell, providing support to the transmembrane direction.

Protein Expression 
The protein was found to be expressed in numerous different tissues. The ETS Profile for TMEM268 indicates the gene is expressed ubiquitously within the body. In support, there has been experimental evidence using antibody staining to show various tissue types that express TMEM268.

A recent study linked TMEM268 as a lysosome transporter. The exact function within the lysosome and interactions with other molecules, however, is not known.

Associated Disease 
Due to limited characterization, linkage to associated diseases is not well known. Techniques to view SNPs  have been used in numerous diseases to determine loci influence. In spondylocostal dysostosis and spondyloarthritis, both were found to have SNPs that had indicated TMEM268 as a possible factor to the diseases

Interacting Proteins 
Interacting proteins were found with c-REL(via affinity chromatography and yeast-two hybrid) and ELAV1, via a yeast-two hybrid. REL is associated to be a proto-oncogene that is from a family of transcription factors. It is associated with B-cell proliferation. ELAV1 is associated with binding to mRNA in order to help increase stability of transcripts.

Homology

Ortholog identity and similarity 

Identity of orthologous domains within TMEM268 in other species with a 40% identity and above is shown below. The DUFF4481 start shown on the image retains conservation throughout time. Of interest, areas of transmembrane region are not as conserved as thought, indicating that specific amino acids may not be a vital component towards the protein's function.

Conservation within species 
TMEM268 is conserved in many organisms. Orthologs have been found in mammals, birds, reptiles, amphibians, sharks, fish, and a few insects. It was not found within plants, bacteria, or archea. Amino acid length tends to increase within orthologs as divergence from humans goes up based on BLAST search results for similar proteins.

External links 
 NCBI
 BLAST
 TimeTree
 Softberry

References